Luis Antonio Arias Guzmán (born 17 January 1989) is a Venezuelan volleyball player. He competed in the 2020 Summer Olympics.

References

1989 births
Living people
Volleyball players at the 2020 Summer Olympics
Venezuelan men's volleyball players
Olympic volleyball players of Venezuela
People from Puerto la Cruz
20th-century Venezuelan people
21st-century Venezuelan people